Sidney Rae Hinds (May 14, 1900 – February 17, 1991) was an American highly decorated officer of the United States Army with the rank of brigadier general. He was also sport shooter who competed in the 1924 Summer Olympics and won the gold medal in the team rifle competition.

Early life

Sidney Rae Hinds was born on May 14, 1900 in Newton, Illinois as the son of Daniel C. and Elizabeth (Jackson) Hinds. He spent his high school years in Wahpeton, North Dakota and when he was eighteen years old, he received an appointment from Congressman John Miller Baer to the United States Military Academy at West Point, New York. World War I changed the length of the studies and Hinds graduated in June 1920. He was also commissioned a second lieutenant in infantry.

His class of 1920 was very strong, producing 49 general officers, including Lyman L. Lemnitzer, Clovis E. Byers, Henry I. Hodes, Lawrence J. Carr, Edward J. McGaw, Verne D. Mudge, Richard C. Partridge, Ewart G. Plank, William W. Bessell, Jr., John F. Cassidy, Rex V. Corput, Jr., Francis W. Farrell, William W. Ford, Charles K. Gailey, Joseph E. Harriman, Frederick M. Harris, Sherman V. Hasbrouck, Frederick L. Hayden, Homer W. Kiefer and Maurice W. Daniel.

In 1924 he participated in the Summer Olympics and won the gold medal as a member of the American team in the team free rifle competition. His gold medal in on display at the US Army Infantry Museum at Fort Benning, Georgia.

He died in San Antonio, Texas on February 15, 1991, and is buried at Fort Sam Houston National Cemetery.

During World War II he saved the German town Ahlen by believing the German Dr. Paul Rosenbaum who was responsible for the hospital town. In the early 1990s the park in front of the station in Ahlen was named after him.

Medals and decorations
Here is the ribbon bar of Brigadier general Sidney Rae Hinds:

References

External links
profile
Generals of World War II

1900 births
1991 deaths
People from Newton, Illinois
Military personnel from Illinois
United States Army generals
United States Military Academy alumni
United States Army Command and General Staff College alumni
Recipients of the Distinguished Service Medal (US Army)
Recipients of the Silver Star
Recipients of the Legion of Merit
Chevaliers of the Légion d'honneur
Recipients of the Croix de Guerre 1939–1945 (France)
Recipients of the Croix de guerre (Belgium)
American male sport shooters
United States Distinguished Marksman
ISSF rifle shooters
Shooters at the 1924 Summer Olympics
Olympic gold medalists for the United States in shooting
Olympic medalists in shooting
Medalists at the 1924 Summer Olympics
Burials at Fort Sam Houston National Cemetery
United States Army generals of World War II
20th-century American people